Greenwood County (county code GW) is a county located in the southeast portion of the U.S. state of Kansas. As of the 2020 census, the county population was 6,016. Its county seat and most populous city is Eureka.

History

Early history

For many millennia, the Great Plains of North America was inhabited by nomadic Native Americans.  From the 16th century to 18th century, the Kingdom of France claimed ownership of large parts of North America.  In 1762, after the French and Indian War, France secretly ceded New France to Spain, per the Treaty of Fontainebleau.

19th century
In 1802, Spain returned most of the land to France, but keeping title to about 7,500 square miles.  In 1803, most of the land for modern day Kansas was acquired by the United States from France as part of the 828,000 square mile Louisiana Purchase for 2.83 cents per acre.

In 1854, the Kansas Territory was organized, then in 1861 Kansas became the 34th U.S. state.  In 1855, Greenwood County was established, and named for Alfred B. Greenwood, a U.S. Congressman from Arkansas.

The first railroad in Greenwood County was built through that territory in 1879.

Geography
It is the fifth-largest county in Kansas by area.

Adjacent counties
 Lyon County (north)
 Coffey County (northeast)
 Woodson County (east)
 Wilson County (southeast)
 Elk County (south)
 Butler County (west)
 Chase County (northwest)

Demographics

As of the 2000 census, there were 7,673 people, 3,234 households, and 2,153 families residing in the county.  The population density was 7 people per square mile (3/km2).  There were 4,273 housing units at an average density of 4 per square mile (1/km2).  The racial makeup of the county was 96.53% White, 0.83% Native American, 0.14% Black or African American, 0.10% Asian, 0.81% from other races, and 1.58% from two or more races. Hispanic or Latino of any race were 1.72% of the population.

There were 3,234 households, out of which 27.10% had children under the age of 18 living with them, 56.50% were married couples living together, 6.60% had a female householder with no husband present, and 33.40% were non-families. 30.30% of all households were made up of individuals, and 16.80% had someone living alone who was 65 years of age or older.  The average household size was 2.31 and the average family size was 2.86.

In the county, the population was spread out, with 23.70% under the age of 18, 6.50% from 18 to 24, 23.20% from 25 to 44, 23.70% from 45 to 64, and 22.80% who were 65 years of age or older.  The median age was 43 years. For every 100 females there were 95.50 males.  For every 100 females age 18 and over, there were 91.50 males.

The median income for a household in the county was $30,169, and the median income for a family was $38,140. Males had a median income of $27,021 versus $19,356 for females. The per capita income for the county was $15,976.  About 8.20% of families and 12.50% of the population were below the poverty line, including 16.20% of those under age 18 and 10.10% of those age 65 or over.

Government
Greenwood county is often carried by Republican Candidates. The last time a Democratic candidate has carried this county was in 1936 by Franklin D. Roosevelt.

Presidential elections

Laws
Greenwood County was a prohibition, or "dry", county until the Kansas Constitution was amended in 1986 and voters approved the sale of alcoholic liquor by the individual drink with a 30% food sales requirement.

The county narrowly voted "No" on the 2022 Kansas Value Them Both Amendment, an anti-abortion ballot measure, by 50.16% to 48.84% despite backing Donald Trump with 79% of the vote to Joe Biden's 18% in the 2020 presidential election.

Education

Unified school districts
 Madison–Virgil USD 386
 Eureka USD 389
 Hamilton USD 390

School district office in neighboring county
 West Elk USD 282 (serving Severy and extreme southern GW county)

Communities

Cities
 Climax
 Eureka
 Fall River
 Hamilton
 Madison
 Severy
 Virgil

Unincorporated communities
† means a Census-Designated Place (CDP) by the United States Census Bureau.
 Lamont
 Neal†
 Piedmont†
 Quincy
 Reece
 Tonovay

Ghost towns
 Ivanpah
 Lapland
 Teterville
 Thrall
 Utopia

Townships
Greenwood County is divided into fifteen townships.  The city of Eureka is considered governmentally independent and is excluded from the census figures for the townships.  In the following table, the population center is the largest city (or cities) included in that township's population total, if it is of a significant size.

See also
 National Register of Historic Places listings in Greenwood County, Kansas

References

Notes

Further reading

 Handbook of Greenwood County, Kansas; C.S. Burch Publishing Co; 37 pages; 1880s.
 Standard Atlas of Greenwood County, Kansas; Geo. A. Ogle & Co; 78 pages; 1922.
 Plat Book of Greenwood County, Kansas; North West Publishing Co; 58 pages; 1903.
 Handbook of Greenwood County, Kansas; C. S. Burch Publishing Co; 37 pages; 1880 to 1890.

External links

County
 
 Greenwood County - Directory of Public Officials
Maps
 Greenwood County Maps: Current, Historic, KDOT
 Kansas Highway Maps: Current, Historic, KDOT
 Kansas Railroad Maps: Current, 1996, 1915, KDOT and Kansas Historical Society

 
Kansas counties
1855 establishments in Kansas Territory